David Gregg Buxton is an American politician. A Republican, he has served in the Utah State Senate since January 2017. He was previously a member of the Utah House of Representatives.  He resigned his seat in 2007 to become the director of the Division of Facilities Construction and Management of Utah.

References

External links
D. Gregg Buxton at Utah State Senate
Deseret News, Jun 4, 2008.

Republican Party members of the Utah House of Representatives
Republican Party Utah state senators
Living people
Year of birth missing (living people)
Place of birth missing (living people)
21st-century American politicians